Árpádhalom is a village in Csongrád County, in the Southern Great Plain region of southern Hungary.

Geography

Populated places in Csongrád-Csanád County